Joseph Herbert Mayer (2 March 1902 – 6 September 1981) was an English first-class cricketer who played with Warwickshire.

A right-arm fast medium bowler, Mayer took 1142 wickets for Warwickshire which has been bettered by only three players. He had his best season in 1929 when he took 126 wickets at 22.35 and followed it up with 108 the following season.

External links
CricketArchive

1902 births
1981 deaths
English cricketers
Warwickshire cricketers
Players cricketers
Staffordshire cricketers
English cricketers of 1919 to 1945